Lucas Demitra (born 9 April 2003) is a Slovak footballer who plays for FC ViOn Zlaté Moravce in the Fortuna Liga as a winger, on loan from AS Trenčín.

Early life
Demitra is the son of Slovak ice hockey player Pavol Demitra and Mária Demitrová. He was born in St. Louis, Missouri, United States, where his father played for the St. Louis Blues of the National Hockey League. Before dedicating himself to professional football, Demitra followed his father's footsteps and tried ice hockey at youth levels. Demitra was 8 years old when his father died in the crash of YAK-Service Flight 9633.

Club career

AS Trenčín
Demitra made his Fortuna Liga debut for AS Trenčín against FC DAC 1904 Dunajská Streda on 14 February 2021.

References

External links
 AS Trenčín official club profile 
 Futbalnet profile 
 

2003 births
Living people
Soccer players from St. Louis
Slovak footballers
Association football forwards
AS Trenčín players
FK Dubnica players
FC ViOn Zlaté Moravce players
Slovak Super Liga players
2. Liga (Slovakia) players